9000 may refer to:

 9000 (number)
 The last year of the 9th millennium, an exceptional common year starting on Wednesday

Business 
 ISO 9000, a family of standards for quality management systems
 TL 9000, a quality management system

Entertainment 
 BFG 9000, a fictional weapon
 HAL 9000, a fictional computer

Technology 
 IBM ES/9000, a mainframe computer
 IBM System 9000, a family of microcomputers
 HP 9000, a family of workstation and server computers
 VAX 9000, a mainframe computer
 Nokia 9000 Communicator, a smart phone introduced in 1996
 ATI Radeon 9000, a computer graphics card series

Transport 
 9000 series (disambiguation), Japanese, Korean, Latin America and Spanish train types
 Saab 9000, Saab's executive car, produced 1985–98

Other 
 9000 Hal, an asteroid
 Beretta 9000, a hand gun
 It's Over 9000!, an internet meme